Liverpool Street is a street in the Hobart City Centre, in the state of Tasmania.

It runs parallel to Macquarie and Davey Streets from Brooker Avenue in the north, then southward through the central section of the CBD where it crosses  Campbell Street, Argyle Street,  Murray Street and Elizabeth Street, and then on to the south end of the city centre.

It was well photographed at the end of the nineteenth and beginning of the twentieth centuries. 

Historically locals referred to the "west end" of Hobart's CBD when frequenting the cinema or theatre along Liverpool Street, which was home to the Odeon Theatre and His Majesty’s Theatre. Village Cinemas capitalised on this in 1976, naming Tasmania's first multiplex on nearby Collins Street the West End Twin.

Royal Hobart Hospital is located on its eastern side, near Brooker Avenue.

It has had in the past hotels, like Harringtons, on the corner of Liverpool and Harrington Street.

On 22 September 2007 fire destroyed the historic Myer building. In November 2014 construction started on the site.

On 26 November 2015 stage 1 of the new Myer store opened. During construction of stage 1 at Myer Liverpool Street between Murray Street and Elizabeth Street was changed from two lanes to one lane.

Liverpool Street tram line

Between 1893 - 1958, trams operated along the Liverpool Street line. Commencing at the Hobart Railway Station, the line travelled up Liverpool Street through Hobart CBD, before beginning to climb westwards into the foothills of kunanyi / Mount Wellington. It was a double track to Warwick Street, except for two sections where the curve or narrowness of the road required a single contraflow section of track.

This line was exceptionally heavily used, and during peak hour traffic, it was usual for two cars to run each scheduled service. On certain occasions, even three cars were operated in conjunction for the run as far as Warwick Street.

The Liverpool Street line crossed the Elizabeth Street line on the level at the junction which is now the northern end of the Elizabeth Street Mall, but its only connection to the rest of the network was a single line in Park and lower Macquarie Streets in front of the Hobart tram depot.

Notes

 
Streets in Hobart